Anne Eggebroten (born 1948) is an American author and feminist scholar. She is known for her book Abortion: My Choice, God's Grace. She was also a founding member of the Christian feminist organization Evangelical and Ecumenical Women's Caucus. She received a doctorate in medieval studies from UC Berkeley. She currently teaches at California State University, Northridge and contributes regularly to Women's enews and Christian Feminism Today. She has three daughters.

Eggebroten was strongly critical of a 2009 case in Brazil where the disgraced archbishop of Olinda and Recife pronounced an excommunication for an abortion after a case of incest.

References

Citations

Bibliography
 Evangelical and Ecumenical Women's Caucus
 Christian Feminism Today
 Hope Publishing House: Books on Social Change & Health
 Women's ENews: Article

1948 births
21st-century American women writers
American feminist writers
Christian feminist theologians
Living people
California State University, Northridge faculty
American abortion-rights activists
Leaders of Christian parachurch organizations
Christianity and abortion
University of California, Berkeley alumni